Kill Me Because I'm Dying! (Spanish: ¡¡¡Mátenme porque me muero!!!) is a 1951 Mexican comedy film directed by Ismael Rodríguez and starring Germán Valdés, Óscar Pulido and Yolanda Montes.

Cast
 Germán Valdés as Tin-Tan 
 Óscar Pulido 
 Yolanda Montes 
 Marcelo Chávez 
 José René Ruiz
 Emma Rodríguez
 Tito Novaro
 Joaquín García Vargas
 Miguel Manzano 
 Pompín Iglesias
 Ildefonso Sánchez Curiel
 Pedro de Urdimalas
 Nicolás Rodríguez 
 Jesús Graña
 Jorge Treviño
 Guillermo Calles 
 Abel Cureño
 El Gigantón
 Los Sherife
 José Ángel Espinosa 'Ferrusquilla' as Narrator  
 Victorio Blanco 
 Guillermo Bravo Sosa
 Leonor Gómez as Cliente en bar  
 Héctor Mateos 
 José Muñoz
 José Pardavé
 Juan Pulido
 Francisco Reiguera
 Ismael Rodríguez as Transeúnte  
 Ramón Valdés 
 Armando Velasco

References

Bibliography 
 Rogelio Agrasánchez. Cine Mexicano: Posters from the Golden Age, 1936-1956. Chronicle Books, 2001.

External links 
 

1951 films
1951 comedy films
Mexican comedy films
1950s Spanish-language films
Films directed by Ismael Rodríguez
Mexican black-and-white films
1950s Mexican films